Gangsta's Paradise is the second studio album by American rapper Coolio, released on November 7, 1995. It is Coolio's best-selling album, with over two million copies sold in the United States. The album produced three singles, which became hits: the title track (which was first used in the 1995 film Dangerous Minds, released before Coolio's album), "1, 2, 3, 4 (Sumpin' New)", and "Too Hot".

Album information
Three songs were released as singles. "Gangsta's Paradise" reached number one on the Billboard Hot 100, "1, 2, 3, 4 (Sumpin' New)" reached number 5, and "Too Hot" peaked at number 24.

The album was nominated for a 1997 Grammy for Best Rap Album. The song "Gangsta's Paradise" won a 1996 Grammy Award for Best Rap Solo Performance. "Sumpin' New" was nominated for a 1997 Grammy Award for Best Rap Solo Performance.

Reception

Spin gave the album 8 out of 10, and said, "Today's rappers aren't interested in sharing any knowledge with outsiders. Coolio is the great exception... the most stylistically broad mainstream rap album you'll probably hear all year. Even upon first listen, it sounds like a collection of hits."

Entertainment Weekly ranked the album #4 on EW's Top 10 Albums of 1995, and said, "The level-headed street philosopher, preaching respect for black women, fatherly responsibility, and safe sex... continuing in the great tradition of Sly Stone and Stevie Wonder... Coolio and his crew make the ghetto seem not just a place of desolation, but of hope."

The Source gave the album 4 Mics out of 5, and said, "The crazy braided one brings skilled and insightful lyrics that reach and relate to all levels of the Black experience... sets standards that corny lyrics and catchy loops can't compete with... Few artists can straddle the line between commercial and underground hip-hop."

Musician said, "Coolio ties his music to a message that's as deep as the groove."

Rap Pages gave the album 7 out of 10, and said, "Maybe because he rapped for a decade with no props, got yanked on record deals... this cool-ass homie from Compton has stayed grounded... Coolio rejoices in the only life he knows."

NME gave the album 7 out of 10, and said, "Instead of playing the role of the Uzi-toting big-shot, he adopts a more reflective view of urban life in Los Angeles... In doing so, Coolio takes a deliberate step forward from last year's light-hearted debut."

Track listing

Samples and interpolations
"Geto Highlites" contains a sample of "Groove With You", originally performed by The Isley Brothers. The intro of the song contains interpolations of the lines "What you gonna play now?" from "Make It Funky", originally performed by James Brown, and "Get on up" from "Get Up (I Feel Like Being a) Sex Machine", also originally performed by James Brown.
"Gangsta's Paradise" contains an interpolation of "Pastime Paradise", originally performed by Stevie Wonder, and the first line of the song is taken from Psalm 23.
"Too Hot" contains an interpolation of "Too Hot", originally performed by Kool & The Gang.
"Cruisin'" contains an interpolation of "Cruisin'", originally performed by Smokey Robinson & the Miracles.
"1, 2, 3, 4 (Sumpin' New)" contains samples of "Thighs High (Grip Your Hips More)", originally performed by Tom Browne, and "Wikka Wrap", originally performed by The Evasions.
"Smilin'" contains an interpolation of "You Caught Me Smiling", originally performed by Sly & The Family Stone.
"Kinda High, Kinda Drunk" contains interpolations of "Saturday Night" and "The Boyz in Da Hood"
"For My Sistas" contains an interpolation of "Make Me Say It Again Girl", originally performed by The Isley Brothers.
"A Thing Goin' On" contains an interpolation of "Me and Mrs. Jones", originally performed by Billy Paul.
"The Revolution" contains an interpolation of "Magic Night".
"Get Up, Get Down" contains an interpolation of "Chameleon", originally performed by Herbie Hancock.

Charts

Weekly charts

Year-end charts

Certifications and sales

References

1995 albums
Coolio albums
Tommy Boy Records albums
Gangsta rap albums by American artists
G-funk albums